Gare de Dol-de-Bretagne is a railway station serving the town Dol-de-Bretagne, Ille-et-Vilaine department, western France.

The station is situated on the Rennes–Saint-Malo and the Lison–Lamballe railways.

Services

The station is served by high speed trains to Rennes and Paris, and regional trains to Saint-Malo, Saint-Brieuc, Granville and Rennes.

References

Railway stations in Ille-et-Vilaine
TER Bretagne
Railway stations in France opened in 1864